An orientation sensor can be found in some digital cameras. By recording the orientation at the time of capture, the camera's software can determine whether the image should be oriented to landscape or portrait format.

References

Camera features